Concord may refer to:

Meaning "agreement"
 Pact or treaty, frequently between nations (indicating a condition of harmony)
 Harmony, in music
 Agreement (linguistics), a change in the form of a word depending on grammatical features of other words

Buildings

 Concord (District Heights, Maryland), a historic building listed on the NRHP in Maryland
 Concord (Natchez, Mississippi), a historic mansion built in 1789, burned down in 1901
 Concord Building, in the U.S. city of Portland, Oregon
Concord Oval, a rugby stadium in New South Wales, Australia
 Concord Resort Hotel, a former hotel and resort in the Catskills, New York
 Temple of Concord in ancient Rome, dedicated to the goddess Concordia

Businesses
 Concord Camera Corporation, a manufacturer of cameras and other digital products
 Concord EFS, Inc., a corporation that merged in 2004 with First Data
 Concord (entertainment company), company that administers sound recording, music publishing and theatrical rights
 Concord Music Group, predecessor to the current company
 Concord Records, a U.S. record label
 Concord Jazz, a subsidiary of Concord Records
 Concord New Energy, an electricity generating company
 Concord Watch Company, based in Biel, Switzerland

Events
 Concord Jazz Festival in Concord, California
 The Battles of Lexington and Concord, Massachusetts, in the American Revolution

Places

Australia
Concord, New South Wales
Concord Parish, Cumberland, New South Wales
Concord West, New South Wales

United States
 Concord, Alabama
 Concord, Arkansas
 Concord, California
 Concord station (BART), a Bay Area Rapid Transit station in Concord, California
 Concord Naval Weapons Station
 Concord, California, the former name of Orleans Flat, California
 Concord, Delaware
 Concord, Georgia
 Concord, Illinois
 Concord, DeKalb County, Indiana
 Concord, Tippecanoe County, Indiana
 Concord, Kentucky
 Concord, Maine
 Concord, Massachusetts
 Concord River
 Concord station (Massachusetts)
 Concord, Michigan
 Concord Village Historic District (Concord, Michigan)
 Concord, Minnesota
 Concord, Missouri, a census-designated place in St. Louis County
 Concord, Callaway County, Missouri
 Concord, Pemiscot County, Missouri
 Concord, Nebraska
 Concord, New Hampshire, the capital of the state of New Hampshire
 Concord, New York, a town in Erie County
 Concord (hamlet), New York, within the town of Concord
 Concord, Staten Island, New York, a neighborhood
 Concord, North Carolina
 Concord Speedway, in Midland, North Carolina
 Concord, Ohio
 Concord, Pennsylvania
 Concord, Tennessee, in Knox County
 Concord, Cherokee County, Texas
 Concord, Leon County, Texas
 Concord, Rusk County, Texas
 Concord, Vermont, a town in Essex County
 Concord (CDP), Vermont, within the town of Concord
 Concord, Brunswick County, Virginia
 Concord, Campbell County, Virginia
 Concord, Gloucester County, Virginia
 Concord, West Virginia (disambiguation) (several)
 Concord, Wisconsin, a town
 Concord (community), Wisconsin, an unincorporated community
 Concord Township (disambiguation) (several)

Elsewhere
 Concord, Sunderland, Tyne and Wear, UK
 Concord, Ontario, Canada
 Concord, New Zealand, a suburb of Dunedin, New Zealand
 Concord Mountains, Antarctica
 Concord Peak, a mountain on the Afghanistan-Tajikistan border

Schools

United States
 Concord Academy, Massachusetts
 Concord Academy (Memphis), Tennessee
 Concord Elementary School (disambiguation), several schools in the United States
 Concord High School (disambiguation), several in the United States and Australia
 Concord Law School of Kaplan University, Los Angeles, California
 Concord University, Athens, West Virginia, previously called Concord College

Elsewhere
 Concord High School (disambiguation), several in the United States and Australia
 Concord Primary School, Choa Chu Kang, Singapore
 Concord College, Acton Burnell, Shrewsbury, UK

Vehicles

Air
 Concorde, Anglo-French supersonic passenger plane, originally spelled Concord in English

Land
 Concord Coach, a horse-drawn vehicle
 AMC Concord, a compact car built by American Motors Corporation
 Kia Concord, a car built by Kia Motors
 Plymouth Concord, a full-size car built by Plymouth

Sea
 , more than one ship of the British Royal Navy
 , more than one United States Navy ship
 Concord (1683), a civilian ship that brought the first German migrants to territory that later became the United States
 Concord (1807 ship), a British merchant and whaling ship, wrecked 1816

Other uses
 CONCORD, the European NGO Confederation for Relief and Development
 Concord Coalition, a non-partisan American political group
 Concord Condor, a cartoon character
 Concord grape, a variety of grape
 Book of Concord of the Lutheran Church
 Piano Sonata No. 2 (Ives), by Charles Ives, commonly known as the Concord Sonata

See also
 Concorde (disambiguation)
 Concordia (disambiguation)
 Concord Airport (disambiguation)
 Concord Coach (disambiguation)
 Concord Hospital (disambiguation)
 Concord Mall (disambiguation)
 Concord Park (disambiguation)
 Concord station (disambiguation)
 Concordance (disambiguation)